Tumakuru District  is an administrative district in the state of Karnataka in India. It is the  third largest district in Karnataka by land area with an area of 10,598 km2, and fourth largest by Population. It is a one-and-a-half-hour drive from Bengaluru, the state capital. The district is known for the production of coconuts and is also called as 'Kalpataru Nadu'. It is the only discontiguous district in Karnataka (Pavagada Taluk has no geographical continuity with the rest of the district).

As of census of 2011, the district has a population of 2,678,980, with a population density of 253 people /km2, the district has the literary rate of 75.14% and a sex ratio of 984 women/ 1000 men. Tumakuru district is surrounded by Chikkaballapura district and Bengaluru Rural in East, Ramanagara District in South-East, Mandya and Hassan Districts in South-West, Chikmagalur District in west, Chitradurga district in north-west and Sri Sathya Sai district and Anantapur district of Andhra Pradesh in North.

History
The district was formed in 1832 during the days of British commissioner of Mysuru Sir Mark Cubbon as Chitaldroog Division including the area of present Chitradurga and Tumakuru districts headquartered at Tumakuru, Major General Richard Stewart Dobbs was the first collector of the district (term of office 1835–1861), who was key responsible for the establishment of Munro system of administration. In the year 1862 Chitaldroog division was abolished and Tumakuru (Nandidroog division) and Chitradurga (Nagar Division) established as separate districts by Lewin Bentham Bowring. The district occupies an area of 10,598 km2 and had a population of 2,678,980, of which 19.62% were urban as of 2011. The district is known for the production of coconuts, called as 'Kalpataru Nadu'. It is the only discontiguous district in Karnataka (Pavagada Taluk has no geographical continuity with the rest of the district).

Geography
Tumakuru District has ten talukas, eleven Assembly constituencies and the District is shared among three Parliamentary constituencies. Tumakuru District shares border with ten districts, which is the highest in the state. The districts that share the border are Districts of Chitradurga towards north, Hassan and Chikkamagaluru towards west, Mandya towards south-west, Ramanagara and Bengaluru Rural and Bengaluru Urban towards south, Chikkaballapura towards east and Sri Sathya Sai district and Anantapur district (Andhra Pradesh) towards north-east.

It consists chiefly of elevated land intersected by river valleys. A range of hills rising to nearly  crosses it from north to south, forming the watershed between the systems of the Krishna and the Kaveri. The principal streams are the Jayamangali and the Shimsha. The mineral wealth of Tumakuru is considerable; iron is obtained in large quantities from the hillsides; and excellent building-stone is quarried. The slopes of the Devarayanadurga hills are clothed with forests. Wildlife such as leopards, Indian Hyena, bears and wild boar have been recorded here. Although, tigers have been recorded from these forests as late as the 1950s, most recent reports are of stray sightings and need confirmation. The annual rainfall averages 39 inches.

Demographics

According to the 2011 census Tumakuru district has a population of 2,678,980, roughly equal to the nation of Kuwait or the US state of Nevada. 
The district ranked 4th place in terms of population in Karnataka after Bengaluru, Belagavi and Mysuru. The district has a population density of 253 per square km. Its population growth rate over the decade 2001–2011 was 3.74%. Tumkur has a sex ratio of 984 females for every 1000 males, and a literacy rate of 75.14%. Scheduled Castes and Scheduled Tribes make up 18.92% and 7.82% of the population respectively.

Religion

Language

At the time of the 2011 census, 84.95% of the population spoke Kannada, 9.03% Urdu, 3.38% Telugu and 1.07% Lambadi as their first language.

Description

The known history of Tumakuru district begins with the Gangas. The Ganga family ruled over the southern and eastern districts of the State from early in the Christian era to 1025 A.D. The earliest record of the Ganga family found in this district belongs to about 400 A.D. After the Gangas, Tumkur was ruled by the Rastrakutas and the Chalukyas. The Nolambas under these rulers ruled the area for a long time. The cholas also ruled some parts of the district. The Vijayanagara Empire ruled supreme for the later part of the 13th to 17th century. During the 18th and 19th century, Tumkur was ruled by the Wodeyars of Mysore until Independence.

The Tumakuru Town Municipality was set up by the British and Mysore Wodeyars in the 1916. Self-rule of the residents started after the setting up of the municipality. It was converted into a City Corporation only in 2010 by adding 22 villages adjoining the city.

Economy
Tumakuru is now a middle class majority city, with a literacy rate of 80%, mainly traders, government employees, small and medium industrialists, self-employed individuals etc. The GDP of Tumkur is around 6045184 Rs lakh (2019–20) and the total collection of income tax in the last financial year was approximately 800 million. The aspirational level of the citizens is very high. Being an agrarian economy, the major plantation crops of Tumkur are coconuts and areca nuts. The major cash crops are paddy, ragi and groundnuts. Iron ore, manganese and granite are the major minerals found in Tumkur District.

Owing to its proximity to Bangalore, besides being the gateway to Karnataka, being on the Chennai – Mumbai Industrial Corridor and the infrastructure that Tumkur provides, Tumkur has the potential to be the satellite city to decongest the State Capital of Bangalore. And also has been identified as National Investment and Manufacturing Zone (NIMZ). NIMZ of approx. 13500 acres and the HAL Helicopter manufacturing facility (Nr Gubbi) 610 acres will be developed as integrated industrial townships with state-of-the art infrastructure and land use on the basis of zoning; clean and energy efficient technology; necessary social infrastructure; skill development facilities, etc., for promoting world class manufacturing activity. Tumkur is home to 24 large scale industries with an investment of 9114.2 million and generating an employment for 6445 persons. The existing 15 medium scale industries and 23804 micro and small Industries employ 132994 persons and account for an investment of close to 7.90 billion. Also 2000 MW of Solar power plant on 11000 acres in Pavagada to cater to the power needs of Tumkur and adjoining districts.

Tumkur is a knowledge hub in the south interior Karnataka and boasts of its own Tumkur University, two medical colleges, five engineering colleges, 38-degree and post-graduate colleges, one dental college and many polytechnics, high schools and primary schools imparting top-level education to all classes of citizens.

The Indian budget for 2014–15 held on 10 July 2014 had announced that Tumkur is one of the cities in south India to be developed as an "Industrial Smart" city. The city was selected as one among the 100 in the country shortlisted for the Smart City project. Tumkur is competing now to be one among the 20 to be taken up for development. The government of India has promised 1 billion each as a matching grant for five years and the local Body with assistance from the state government has to match another 1 billion. Thus, in five years development to the tune of 10 billion will happen in Smart City. The Tumkur District Chamber of Commerce and Industry under the leadership of Surendra Shah, President 2014–16 is striving for the district to be developed as a "Knowledge Industry New Destination city" (KIND).

Taluks

 Chikkanayakanahalli
 Gubbi
 Koratagere
 Kunigal
 Madhugiri
 Pavagada
 Sira
 Tiptur
 Tumakuru
 Turuvekere

Education
It is a good study center from primary education to higher education. It has its own university. Within this town, there are seven technology institutions, two medical institutions and one dental institution.

The district is divided as two Educational district. i.e. Tumakuru (south) and other one is Tumakuru (north) Madhugiri Educational district. Where as Tumakuru (south) includes 6 taluks as Chikkanayakanahalli,Gubbi,Kunigal,Tiptur,Tumakuru and Turuvekere.And Tumkur (north) Madhugiri district includes 4 taluks namely koratagere, Madhugiri, Pavagada and Sira.Tumkur(south) considered as education hub nowadays.
 
It consists 2085 Govt.Primary schools, 63 aided Primary schools, 267 unaided Primary schools and 2 kendriya vidyalaya, and total 2,417 primary schools, there are 147 Govt. High  schools, 205 aided High schools, 123 unaided High schools, and 2 central govt. High schools in the Tumkur south dist.Tumkur north dist, there are 1291 Govt. primary, 9 aided Primary schools, 123 unaided Primary schools exists.Vice versa there are 113 Govt. high schools, 109 aided High schools, 57 unaided high schools facility available.

Educational institutions in Tumakuru 

 Sri Udaya Bharathi Educational and Charitable Institutions
 Akshaya Group of Educational Institutions
 Aryabharathi group of Educational Institutions
 Channabasaveshwara Group of Educational Institutions 
 HMS Group of Educational Institutions
 Jain Group of Institutions 
 Kalpataru Group of Educational Institutions
 Maruthi Group of Educational Institutions
 Sacred Heart Group of Educational Institutions 
 Sarvodaya Group of Educational Institutions 
 Shridevi Group of Educational Institutions
 Siddaganga Group of Educational Institutions 
 Sri Siddharatha Group of Educational Institutions
 Sri Vidyodaya Foundation Trust
 St.Joseph's Group of Educational Institutions 
 Varadaraja Group of Institutions
 Vidya Group of Educational Institutions (managed by AspireTechno)
 Vidyanikethan Group of Institutions
 Vidyavahini Group of Educational Institutions

Image gallery

Notable people

Social service
Sree Sree Shivakumara Swamiji

Actors
Arjun Sarja, actor and film producer
Narasimharaju, Kannada actor
Umashree, actress, politician, former minister in Government of Karnataka
Manjula, Kannada actress
Sharath Lohitashwa, actor
Lohithaswa T. S., actor and writer
Siddhanth, actor and film producer
Rangayana Raghu, actor
Ashika Ranganath, actress
Suman Ranganath, actress
Jaggesh, actor
Komal, actor

Arts
Gubbi Veeranna, theater director
T. Sunandamma, writer and humorist
Renuka Kesaramadu, painter and sculptor
Amarashilpi Jakanachari, sculptor
Baraguru Ramachandrappa, film director and writer
Chandrika Gururaj, playback singer

Writers
 K. B. Siddaiah, professor, poet, and social activist

Athletes
Poll Shyamsunder, cricketer
Poll Ashokanand, cricketer

Politicians
G. Parameshwara, former Deputy Chief Minister of Karnataka
T. B. Jayachandra, former Law Minister of Karnataka
G. S. Basavaraj, Indian politician
S. Mallikarjunaiah, Indian politician
K. Lakkappa, Indian politician

Others
C. P. Sadashivaiah, agriculture scientist
Raja Ramanna, physicist
M. S. Ramaiah, founder of MSR group of institutions

Towns and villages
 

 Amruthur
 Bajagur
 Hagalavadi
 Kenkere
 Kottanahalli
 Mallasandra
 Marconahalli
 Yalachigere

References

External links

 Official website of Tumkur District Website
 Official website of Tumkur city
 Official website of Tumkur Zilla Panchayat
 Grama Panchayats of Karnataka Tumkur District

Districts of Karnataka
 
1832 establishments in India